Sukabumi Utara (Indonesian for North Sukabumi) is an administrative village in the Kebon Jeruk district, city of West Jakarta, Indonesia. It has postal code of 11540.

See also 

 Kebon Jeruk
 List of administrative villages of Jakarta

References 

Districts of Jakarta
West Jakarta